The women's individual recurve archery competition at the 2017 Summer Universiade was held in the National Taiwan Sport University Stadium, Taipei, Taiwan between August 20–24.

Records 
Prior to the competition, the world and Universiade records were as follows.

Initial records

72 arrows ranking round

Broken records

72 arrows ranking round

Ranking round 

The ranking round took place on 20 August 2017 to determine the seeding for the elimination rounds. It consisted of two rounds of 36 arrows, with a maximum score of 720.

Elimination round

Section 1

Section 2

Section 3

Section 4

Section 5

Section 6

Section 7

Section 8

Finals

Note: An asterisk (*) denotes a win from a one-arrow shoot-off 
Source:

References 

Women's individual recurve